Santa María District may refer to:

 Santa María District, Huaura, in Huaura Province, XXX region, Peru
 Santa María District, Panama
 Santa María District, Dota, in Dota Canton, San José Province, Costa Rica

See also
Santa Maria (disambiguation)